Gastric atresia is a congenital defect with complete occlusion of the pyloric outlet of the stomach.

Cause
Gastric atresia is a birth defect. It can be genetic, inherited in an autosomal recessive manner, and associated with conditions like Down syndrome and junctional epidermolysis bullosa (medicine). In about 60% of cases, the outlet of the stomach is covered by a membrane. In around 35% of cases, solid tissue blocks the outlet. In the remaining cases (less than 10%), there is a complete separation of the stomach and the small intestine.

Diagnosis
Polyhydramnios is often seen during pregnancy, and prenatal diagnosis is common. Infants with gastric atresia will exhibit forceful vomiting upon the first feeding. Imaging is required for diagnosis.

Treatment
Treatment is surgical and involves removing or bypassing the obstruction.

Epidemiology
It is seen in approximately 1 in 100,000 live births.

References

Congenital disorders of digestive system
Rare diseases